"The Iceman Cometh" is a 1960 television production of the 1946 Eugene O'Neill play of the same title.  Two separate parts were originally broadcast as episodes of The Play of the Week by the television network and syndication service the NTA Film Network (or NTA).

Cast

Opening credits
Jason Robards, Jr.
Co-Starring Myron McCormick
and in order of appearance 
Tom Pedi
James Broderick
Farrell Pelly
Robert Redford
Ronald Radd
Roland Winters
Harrison Dowd
Michael Strong

Closing credits
starred Jason Robards, Jr. as Theodore "Hickey" Hickman
co-starred Myron McCormick as Larry Slade
also starred in order of appearance

Introductory remarks

Part 1
"Good evening. I'm Worthington Miner. As executive producer of The Play of the Week, I take a personal pride and honor in our presenting to you tonight one of the great plays of our generation, The Iceman Cometh by Eugene O'Neill. As a symbol of the stature of this event, Mister Brooks Atkinson, essayist, correspondent and, for thirty-five years, drama critic of The New York Times, has consented to appear on this program to say a few words to you about Mister O'Neill and his meaning to the American theater. Mister Atkinson…"

Brooks Atkinson: "The Play of the Week is about to present, for the first time on this series, a drama by a man more widely respected and acclaimed throughout the world than any American dramatist, Eugene O'Neill. Few men of any age have been able to see, far less to transmit, the passions, the agonies, the wisdom and the corrosive humors that lie in the hearts and the minds of derelict mankind. O'Neill has this depth, a depth of humanity, of pity and love and respect, even for the dregs of society. He knew their idiom of speech, their habitual profanity, their coarseness. And yet he touched these vulgarities with a poet's understanding and with the generosity of a deeply reverent heart. O'Neill wrote with respect for the stark truth that he saw as the authentic garment of the tortured human being. The Iceman Cometh is a harsh and ruthless drama. It appeals to the mature mind and a sensitive spirit. It is one of America's greatest plays and a sensitive and mature audience deserves to see it."

Part 2
"Good evening. I'm Worthington Miner, executive producer of Play of the Week. Tonight, we are presenting part two of The Iceman Cometh by Eugene O'Neill. But first, I would like to introduce Mister Brooks Atkinson, for thirty-five years, drama critic of The New York Times, who will say a few words to you about Mister O'Neill and The Iceman Cometh. Mister Atkinson…"

Brooks Atkinson: "The Play of the Week is about to present the second part of The Iceman Cometh. It is one of the last plays of Eugene O'Neill. Few men of any age have been able to recognize and convey the passions, the agonies and the corrosive humors that lie in the hearts and the minds of derelict mankind, but O'Neill has this depth, a depth of love and respect, even for the dregs of society. He knew their speech and their common profanity, their coarseness, and yet he touched these vulgarities with a poet's understanding. O'Neill wrote with respect for the stark truths that he saw as the authentic garment of the tortured human being. The Iceman Cometh is a harsh and ruthless drama. It appeals to the mature mind and the sensitive spirit. It is one of America's greatest plays and a sensitive and mature audience deserves to see it."

Plot summary
See play summary in the article for The Iceman Cometh.

References

External links

1960 television plays
Films based on works by Eugene O'Neill
Films set in the 1900s
Television shows directed by Sidney Lumet
American television films